Cross-Examination is a 1932 American drama film directed by Richard Thorpe and starring H. B. Warner, Sally Blane and Natalie Moorhead.

Synopsis
A defense attorney tries to prove the innocence of his client on a murder charge, despite witness after witness testifying against him. However, during a cross examination of a crucial witness, the lawyer is able to establish the real truth.

Main cast
 H. B. Warner as Gerald Waring - Defense Attorney  
 Sally Blane as Grace Varney  
 Natalie Moorhead as Inez Wells  
 Edmund Breese as Dwight Simpson - Prosecuting Attorney  
 Don Dillaway as David Wells  
 William V. Mong as Emory Wells  
 Sarah Padden as Mary Stevens  
 Niles Welch as Warren Slade  
 Wilfred Lucas as Judge William J. Hollister

References

Bibliography
 Monaco, James. The Encyclopedia of Film. Perigee Books, 1991.

External links
 

1932 films
1932 drama films
1930s English-language films
Films directed by Richard Thorpe
American legal drama films
American black-and-white films
1930s American films